Seán Hewitt (born 1990) is a poet, lecturer and literary critic.

Biography 
Seán Hewitt was born in Warrington, UK, to an Irish mother and English father. He studied English at Girton College, Cambridge.

Hewitt received his PhD, on the works of J. M. Synge, from the Institute of Irish Studies, University of Liverpool. He lives in Dublin, where he lectures in English Literature at Trinity College Dublin, and is Poetry Critic for The Irish Times.

Hewitt was awarded an Eric Gregory Award in 2019, and won the world's biggest ecopoetry award, the Resurgence Prize, in 2017. He also received a Northern Writers' Award in 2016. Hewitt was listed as one of The Sunday Times "30 under 30" artists in Ireland in 2020. His debut collection of poems, Tongues of Fire, won The Laurel Prize in 2021. He was awarded the Rooney Prize for Irish Literature in 2022.

Works 
Hewitt's debut collection, Tongues of Fire, was published by Jonathan Cape in 2020.

Tongues of Fire was released to critical acclaim. It won The Laurel Prize in 2021, and was shortlisted for The Sunday Times Young Writer of the Year, 2020, the John Pollard Foundation International Poetry Prize, 2021, and the Dalkey Literary Award (Emerging Writer), 2021. It was Poetry Book of the Month in The Observer, and a Book of the Year in The Guardian, The Irish Times, The Spectator, Attitude, and the Irish Independent, and was a Poetry Book Society Recommendation. The Sunday Times wrote of Hewitt that "his poetry will stand the test of time". Booker Prize shortlisted novelist Max Porter describes Hewitt as "an exquisitely calm and insightful lyric poet, reverential in nature and gorgeously wise in the field of human drama." Tongues of Fire is a book of lyric poetry, and explores queer sexuality, grief, and the natural world.

Hewitt's book-length study of the Irish playwright, poet and travel writer J. M. Synge, J.M. Synge: Nature, Politics, Modernism, is published by Oxford University Press.

Hewitt's memoir, All Down Darkness Wide, was published in 2022.

Awards 

 Winner of The Rooney Prize for Irish Literature, 2022.
 Winner of The Laurel Prize, 2021.
 Shortlisted for John Pollard Foundation International Poetry Prize, for Tongues of Fire, 2021.
Shortlisted for the Dalkey Literary Award (Emerging Writer), 2021.
Shortlisted for The Sunday Times Young Writer of the Year Award, for Tongues of Fire, 2020.
Poetry Book Society Recommendation, for Tongues of Fire, 2020.
 Eric Gregory Award, Society of Authors, 2019.
 Poetry Book Society Pamphlet Choice, for Lantern, 2019.
 Maurice J. Bric Medal of Excellence, Irish Research Council, 2019.
 The Resurgence Prize, Poetry School, 2017.
 Northern Writers' Award, New Writing North, 2016.

Bibliography 

 All Down Darkness Wide (Jonathan Cape (UK) and Penguin Press (USA), 2022)
 Buile Suibhne / Seán Hewitt, wood engravings by Amy Jeffs (Rochdale, England: Fine Press Poetry, 2021)
J.M. Synge: Nature, Politics, Modernism (Oxford University Press, 2021)
 Tongues of Fire (Jonathan Cape, 2020)
 Lantern (Offord Road Books, 2019)

References 

English poets
Living people
Irish poets
1990 births
Alumni of Girton College, Cambridge
Alumni of the University of Liverpool
People from Warrington
21st-century English poets
21st-century Irish poets